Mait is an Estonian masculine given name.

People named Mait include:
Mait Klaassen (born 1955), veterinary scientist and politician
Mait Kõiv (born 1961), historian (:et)
Mait Künnap (born 1982), tennis player
Mait Laas (born 1970), animated film director
Mait Lepik (born 1968), actor, cinematographer
Mait Mäekivi (born 1959), cinematographer
Mait Malmsten (born 1972), actor
Mait Maltis (born 1951), singer
 (1949–2005), politician
Mait Metsanurk (1879–1957), writer
Mait Müntel (born 1977), physicist (:et)
Mait Patrail (born 1988), handball player 
Mait Püümets (1882–1965), physician and politician
 (born 1963), writer
Mait Riisman (born 1956), water polo player
Mait Vaik (born 1969), rock musician and writer

References

Estonian masculine given names